Agasthiyamalaia pauciflora is a species of flowering plant in the family Clusiaceae. It was recorded in Travancore and Tirunelveli (now located in the states of Kerala and Tamil Nadu respectively) in 19th century India. It has not been recorded since. The specific epithet pauciflora is Latin for 'few-flowered'.

Conservation 
Mass multiplication using tissue culture is being experimented in a species recovery program by Department of Biotechnology, Gauhati University, New Delhi.

References

Critically endangered plants
Clusiaceae
Flora of Kerala
Flora of Tamil Nadu
Taxonomy articles created by Polbot